Moe Kaifuchi (born June 16, 1986 in Hachiōji, Tokyo) is a Japanese slalom canoer. At the 2012 Summer Olympics she competed in the K-1 event, finishing 19th in the heats, failing to qualify for the semifinals.

References

External links
Sports-Reference.com profile

Japanese female canoeists
1986 births
People from Hachiōji, Tokyo
Living people
Olympic canoeists of Japan
Canoeists at the 2012 Summer Olympics